Floating Life is a 1996 Australian drama film directed by Clara Law about a Hong Kong family who move to Australia. The film was selected as the Australian entry for the Best Foreign Language Film at the 69th Academy Awards, but was not accepted as a nominee.

Cast
Annette Shun Wah as Yen Chan
Annie Yip as Bing Chan
Anthony Wong as Gar Ming
Edwin Pang as Mr. Chan
Cecilia Fong Sing Lee as Mrs. Chan
Toby Wong as Yue
Toby Chan as Chau
Julian Pulvermacher as Michael, Yen's husband
Bruce Poon as Cheung, Bing's husband
Celia Ireland

Awards
1996: Locarno International Film Festival Silver Leopard (Clara Law)
1996: Golden Horse Film Festival Golden Horse Award (Best Original Score: Davood A. Tabrizi)
1996: Gijón International Film Festival Best Director (Clara Law)
1996: Gijón International Film Festival Grand Prix Asturias (Best Feature: Clara Law)
1997: Créteil International Women's Film Festival Grand Prix (Clara Law)

Availability
The film was released on videocassette by Cineplex Odeon and Universal in Canada. The film was released on DVD in 2006 by Kanopy for limited Australian institutional use.

Box office
Floating Life grossed $141,398 at the box office in Australia.

See also
 Cinema of Australia
 List of submissions to the 69th Academy Awards for Best Foreign Language Film
 List of Australian submissions for the Academy Award for Best Foreign Language Film

References

External links

Floating Life at Oz Movies
 
Floating Life at the National Film and Sound Archive

1996 films
Australian drama films
1990s Cantonese-language films
1990s German-language films
1996 drama films
Films directed by Clara Law
1990s English-language films